Clayton State University is a public university in Morrow, Georgia. It serves Metro Atlanta and is a selective Senior Unit of the University System of Georgia.

The main campus includes  of wooded grounds, featuring five lakes and a park-like atmosphere.  Located in the north-central part of Clayton County in suburban south metro Atlanta, the main campus is a fifteen-minute drive from Hartsfield-Jackson Atlanta International Airport and about twenty minutes from downtown Atlanta. Clayton State also maintains a separate Fayette County instructional site in Peachtree City and offers additional instruction at locations in Jonesboro in Clayton County and McDonough in Henry County.

Upon opening in 1991, Clayton State's Spivey Hall began presenting jazz, classical music and other musical entertainment. It has since developed into one of the premiere chamber music venues in the Atlanta metropolitan area and offers more than 400 performances per year.  These performances air frequently on Georgia Public Broadcasting.

Clayton State basketball, soccer, cross-country, tennis, golf, and track & field programs are a part of Division II of the National Collegiate Athletic Association (NCAA), competing in the Peach Belt Conference (PBC). In 2011, the Clayton State women's basketball team won the NCAA Division II national championship.

History

The institution was founded in 1969 and was originally known as Clayton Junior College.  When the school became a four-year institution in 1986, the institute took on the name Clayton State College.   In 1996, the Georgia Board of Regents renamed many higher-education institutions, with Clayton State becoming Clayton College and State University. In 2005, the name was changed to Clayton State University to acknowledge its fast-growing undergraduate, graduate, and professional programs. Clayton State University is accredited by the Southern Association of Colleges and Schools Commission on Colleges to award associate, baccalaureate, and master's degrees.

Clayton State University is organized into four colleges and one school:
 College of Arts and Sciences
 College of Business
 College of Health
 College of Information and Mathematical Sciences
 School of Graduate Studies

The College of Business is accredited by the Association to Advance Collegiate Schools of Business; only the top 5% of all business schools worldwide are AACSB accredited. The Harry S. Downs Continuing Education Center, overlooking the main campus lake, offers programs in language, personal growth, and technical subjects, and is also a venue for conferences and special events.

In 2016 the Clinical/Counseling Psychology master's degree program gained Masters in Psychology and Counseling Accreditation Council (MPCAC) accreditation through 2026.

In 2004, approval for developing a masters program was given by the Georgia Board of Regents. Clayton State University currently offers nine master's degree programs and 40 baccalaureate degree majors.

In 2021, Dr. T. Ramon Stuart became Clayton State's first African-American president.

The university is accredited by the Southern Association of Colleges and Schools.

Student body
The majority of Clayton State students come from the Atlanta metro area.  The remaining come from other regions of Georgia, the United States, and some 40 foreign countries.

While one-third of the students are under 22, the median age is 28 and the university is recognized for two-thirds of its students being non-traditional, adult learners.

The U.S. News & World Report ranking of colleges consistently identifies Clayton State University as having one of the most diverse student body populations among comprehensive baccalaureate-level colleges and universities in the southern United States.  More than 80% of the student body self-identify as an ethnic or racial minority (majority African-American).

All students are required to own or have access to a laptop computer, regardless of major or status.
On February 1, 2011, the student login "SWAN" (Student Web Access Network) was updated to be more secure against phishing of students' usernames and passwords. It was updated again in the spring of 2017.

There are over 45 student organizations established on campus.

Clayton State's Greek system consists of three National Pan-Hellenic Council (NPHC) fraternities,  four NPHC sororities, and Alpha Kappa Lambda.  There is no traditional Greek housing on or near campus. Less than five percent of the undergraduate student body are active in the Greek system.

Athletics

Clayton State University is a Division II member of the National Collegiate Athletic Association (NCAA), competing in the Peach Belt Conference (PBC). The university fields varsity teams, known as the Lakers, in five men's and five women's sports: men's and women's basketball, men's and women's cross country, men's golf, men's and women's soccer, women's tennis, and men's and women's indoor and outdoor track and field.

References

External links

 
 Clayton State Athletics website

 
Educational institutions established in 1969
Public universities and colleges in Georgia (U.S. state)
Universities and colleges accredited by the Southern Association of Colleges and Schools
Education in Clayton County, Georgia
Buildings and structures in Clayton County, Georgia
1969 establishments in Georgia (U.S. state)
University System of Georgia